The Kono language (Kɔnɔ) is a language spoken in Sierra Leone by the Kono people. The Kono District is situated in the Eastern Province of Sierra Leone and contains 14 chiefdoms, each headed by a Paramount Chief. The language varies slightly between chiefdoms.

References

Sources
Chiefdom Map of Sierra Leone: OCHA Humanitarian Information Centre and Sierra Leone Information Service, 2001. .

Mande languages
Languages of Sierra Leone